Association football is the most popular sport in almost all South American countries. There are a wide range of sports played in the continent of South America. Popular sports include rugby union, baseball, basketball, tennis, golf, volleyball, hockey, beach volleyball, motorsports and cricket. South America held its first Olympic Games in Rio de Janeiro, Brazil in 2016. Two years prior to this, major cities in Brazil hosted the 2014 FIFA World Cup.

Association football

South America and Europe share the supremacy over the sport, as all national team winners in FIFA World Cup history and all winning teams at the FIFA Club World Cup have come from these two continents. Brazil holds the world record at the FIFA World Cup with five titles in total. Argentina has three titles and Uruguay have two. So far four South American nations have hosted the tournament including its first edition in Uruguay (1930). The other three were Brazil (1950, 2014), Chile (1962), and Argentina (1978).

South America is home to the longest running international football tournament; Copa América, which has been regularly contested since 1916. Uruguay have won the Copa America a record 15 times, beating hosts Argentina in 2011 to reach 15 titles (they were previously equal on 14 titles each during the 2011 Copa America).

The continent has produced many of the most famous and most talented players in history, including Pelé, Garrincha, Ronaldo, Roberto Carlos, Romário, Ronaldinho, Zico, Nílton Santos, Djalma Santos, Taffarel, Falcão, Rivaldo and Neymar (Brazil); Maradona, Messi, Di Stéfano, Batistuta, Passarella, Mario Kempes (Argentina); Luis Suárez, Enzo Francescoli, Cavani, Forlán, Obdulio Varela (Uruguay); Elías Figueroa, Iván Zamorano, Marcelo Salas (Chile); Carlos Valderrama, Radamel Falcao (Colombia); Carlos Gamarra, Romerito, Arsenio Erico (Paraguay); Álex Aguinaga, Alberto Spencer (Ecuador); Teófilo Cubillas, César Cueto, Claudio Pizarro (Peru).

Football variations: futsal, beach soccer, footvolley 

Brazil invented some variations of football, such as beach soccer and footvolley. Futsal, having been invented in Uruguay, neighboring Brazil, is also widely practiced in the country, mainly in the state of Rio Grande do Sul, neighboring Uruguay.

In futsal, Brazil, Argentina and Paraguay are among the greatest world powers. Before the Fifa Era, there were three World Cups, organized by the former International Federation of Indoor Soccer (Fifusa), where Brazil was world champion twice, and Paraguay once. Brazil is the biggest champion of the FIFA Futsal World Cup, with 5 titles, with Argentina having a title in 2021.Falcão is the most renowned male Brazilian player. 

In beach soccer, Brazil and Uruguay are among the world's greatest powers, with Brazil being the biggest champion of the FIFA Beach Soccer World Cup, with 5 titles. In addition, it has nine world titles from the former competition organized by Beach Soccer Worldwide (BSWW), the Beach Soccer World Championships. 

Footvolley is a recreational sport widely practiced on Brazilian beaches, mainly in Rio de Janeiro, where it was invented.

Basketball

Basketball is particularly popular in South America. One of the most important achievements was the Argentina gold medal in Men's Basketball at the 2004 Summer Olympics. Argentina won the World Championship in 1950. In Brazil, basketball became popular with the Brazilian national basketball team winning the World Championship two times (1959, 1963) and the Olympic bronze 3 times. Oscar Schmidt is the most renowned male Brazilian player. The Brazil women's basketball team is also one of the best teams in the world having won the 1994 FIBA World Championship for Women, obtained the Olympic runner-up in 1996, and with three players in the Hall of Fame: Hortência Marcari, Maria Paula Silva and Janeth Arcain. Also, in Venezuela, Uruguay, Chile, Colombia and Paraguay, basketball is widely played & very popular. 

The FIBA World Cup took place in South America seven times: Argentina (1950, 1990), Brazil (1954, 1963), Chile (1959), Uruguay (1967) and Colombia (1982).

Volleyball 

Volleyball is the second most popular sport in Brazil. The Brazilian men's team has 6 Olympic medals (3 gold, 3 silver), 7 World Championship medals (3 gold, 3 silver, 1 bronze) and has won nine World Leagues, while Brazil's women's team has won two gold, one silver and two bronze medals at the Olympic Games, in addition to four runners-up and a third place at World Championships. The women's volleyball in Peru, already had a standout in the '80s, where they won a silver medal olympic. Today the sport is growing in Argentina (male bronze olympic medal) and Venezuela.

Beach Volleyball 

Brazil is one of the strongest countries in the world in beach volleyball, a sport widely practiced in the country due to its long coastline, mainly in Rio de Janeiro and in the Northeast Region of the country. Until the 2020 Olympic Games, the country had 2 golds, 3 silvers and 1 bronze in the men's modality, and 1 gold, 4 silvers and 2 bronzes in the women's modality. Argentina, Chile and Venezuela usually send representatives to the Olympic Games, but without any significant results so far. In world championships, in addition to several titles obtained by Brazilians, the Argentines Mariano Baracetti and Martín Conde were world champions in 2001.

Handball

Handball is a sport that came with German immigrants, which is very popular in schools around South America. It's the second most practiced sport in schools in Brazil. The Brazil men's national handball team is considered the best in South America, with the Argentina men's national handball team being its biggest rival. The biggest highlight in South America, however, has been the Brazil women's national handball team, which, in the 2013 World Championship, were crowned world champions for the first time. They also finished 5th at the 2016 Summer Olympics.

Motorsports

South America have several drivers who won the Formula One championship multiple times, including five-time champion Juan Fangio of Argentina, and Brazilian drivers Emerson Fittipaldi (2 titles), Nelson Piquet (3 titles), and Ayrton Senna (3 titles). Brazil has hosted the Brazilian Grand Prix every year since 1973 and the Argentine Grand Prix has hosted Formula One on 20 occasions. 

In Motos, South America had notable drivers as Johnny Cecotto, Carlos Lavado, Alex Barros, Sebastian Porto, Martín Cárdenas and Yonny Hernández. Also, South America has hosted the Moto GP in Venezuela (1977–1979), Brazil (1987–1989, 1992; 1995–1997, 1999–2004 as Rio Grand Prix) and Argentina (1961–1963, 1981–1982, 1987, 1994–1995, 1998–1999, 2014–present).

The Dakar Rally is also hosted by South America from 2009 to 2019 (mostly in Chile and Argentina).

Tennis

South America has produced a number of talented tennis players such as Maria Bueno, the greatest South American tennis player, three-time French Open winner Gustavo Kuerten, four-time Grand Slam and Masters winner Guillermo Vilas, the first Latin American ranked number 1 in Association of Tennis Professionals (ATP)  Marcelo Rios, the first Latin American World number 1 in women tennis and the first Latin American to win a Grand Slam Anita Lizana, US Open winner Gabriela Sabatini, French Open winners Gastón Gaudio and Andrés Gómez, 2009 US Open winner Juan Martín del Potro, and double Olympic Gold medalist Nicolás Massú. In doubles, the continent has already produced players like Marcelo Melo, Bruno Soares, Luisa Stefani, Juan Sebastian Cabal and Robert Farah. The continent hosts ATP tournaments, such as the ATP 500 in Rio de Janeiro, Brazil, and the ATP 250 in Buenos Aires and Cordoba, in Argentina, and the ATP 250 in Chile. Argentina was Davis Cup champion in 2016, and Brazil was a semi-finalist twice, in 1992 and 2000. Chile has already reached the quarterfinals three times.

Swimming

Brazil is the greatest South American power in swimming, competing on an equal footing with the world's powers in this sport, especially in men's swimming. Some of the greatest exponents of Brazilian swimming history are: César Cielo, Ricardo Prado, Gustavo Borges, Fernando Scherer, Thiago Pereira, Djan Madruga, Bruno Fratus, Manuel dos Santos, Tetsuo Okamoto, Nicholas Santos, Felipe França, Fernando Scheffer, Kaio de Almeida, João Gomes Júnior, Felipe Lima, Guilherme Costa, Ana Marcela Cunha, Etiene Medeiros and Poliana Okimoto. Argentina was the main force on the continent until the 1960s, with historically important swimmers such as Luis Nicolao, José Meolans and Georgina Bardach. Other countries like Venezuela (with Francisco Sánchez, Rafael Vidal and Albert Subirats) and Chile (with Kristel Kobrich) tend to reveal talent from time to time. Brazil hosted the 1995 FINA World Swimming Championships (25 m) and won the 2014 FINA World Swimming Championships (25 m).

Athletics

South America has a number of historically important and some legendary athletes in track and field. In Brazil, the following stand out: Adhemar Ferreira da Silva, Joaquim Cruz, Maurren Maggi, Thiago Braz, Vanderlei Cordeiro de Lima, João Carlos de Oliveira, Robson Caetano, Fabiana Murer, Alison dos Santos, Nélson Prudêncio, Jadel Gregório, Zequinha Barbosa, Sanderlei Parrela, Claudinei Quirino, Vicente de Lima, André Domingos, Édson Ribeiro,Caio Bonfim, Rosângela Santos, Letícia Oro Melo, Mauro Vinícius da Silva and Darlan Romani. Colombia with Caterine Ibargüen, Ximena Restrepo, Anthony Zambrano and Sandra Arenas, Venezuela with Yulimar Rojas, Ecuador with Jefferson Pérez, Argentina with Delfo Cabrera, Juan Carlos Zabala, Noemí Simonetto de Portela and Reinaldo Gorno also contribute to the evolution of sport on the continent. The continent has a great tradition in competitions such as the triple jump, and hosts important events such as the Saint Silvester Road Race.

Boxing

Boxing is particularly strong in South America, with several world and Olympic champions born in the continent. In Argentina, the most historically important boxers are:Carlos Monzón, Horacio Accavallo, Santos Laciar, Juan Martín Coggi, Nicolino Locche, Victor Galindez, Jorge Castro, Marcela Acuña and. Sergio Martínez. In Brazil, Eder Jofre and Acelino Popó Freitas are former world champions; Robson Conceição and Hebert Conceição were Olympic champions, and other Olympic medalists were Servílio de Oliveira, Yamaguchi Falcão, Esquiva Falcão, Abner Teixeira, Adriana Araújo and Beatriz Ferreira.

Judo

Brazil is one of the greatest world powers in judo, a sport developed in the country thanks to its large Japanese community. The greatest exponents of the sport until today were Aurélio Miguel, Sarah Menezes and Rogério Sampaio, Olympic champions. Brazil also had several other important judo athletes, such as the Olympic runners-up Douglas Vieira, Tiago Camilo, Carlos Honorato, and the Olympic bronze medalists Chiaki Ishii, Luiz Onmura, Walter Carmona, Henrique Guimarães, Leandro Guilheiro, Flávio Canto, Ketleyn Quadros, Felipe Kitadai, Mayra Aguiar, Daniel Cargnin and Rafael Silva. The sport has also been developing lately in Argentina, with judokas like Paula Pareto, and in Colombia, with judokas like Yuri Alvear.

Skateboarding

Skateboarding is very popular in Brazil, especially in large urban centers. The country has internationally renowned skaters like Bob Burnquist, Sandro Dias, Rayssa Leal, Pedro Barros, Kelvin Hoefler, Pâmela Rosa and Letícia Bufoni. Peru is a country that shows a certain degree of development in skateboarding, having sent representatives like Angelo Caro Narvaez to World Championships and the Olympics.

Surfing

Surfing is very popular in Brazil. The country has progressively evolved to become one of the biggest forces in the sport in the world. Fábio Gouveia reached number 5 in the world in 1992. In the 2010s, the Brazilian Storm appears, with several Brazilians getting closer to the world title, until Gabriel Medina conquers the same in 2014 and Adriano de Souza wins in 2015. In 2020 surfing ascends to the category of Olympic sport and Ítalo Ferreira becomes Olympic champion. Peru also has renowned surfers such as Lucca Mesinas and Miguel Tudela.

Gymnastics 

Brazil has a large training center for Olympic athletes in Gymnastics, which has already revealed athletes such as Rebeca Andrade, Arthur Zanetti, Daiane dos Santos, Jade Barbosa, Arthur Mariano and Diego Hypólito. In Chile, Tomás González reached 4th place in the floor and vault events at the 2012 London Olympics.

Yachting and Equestrianism

Despite yachting and equestrianism being inaccessible sports for the general population, Brazil has a great tradition in yachting, and, to a lesser extent, but no less important, tradition in equestrianism. The biggest center for these sports in South America is Rio de Janeiro and its neighboring city Niterói. Several Olympic medalists in yachting have trained in Guanabara Bay, such as Martine Grael, Clinio Freitas, Daniel Adler, Eduardo Penido, Isabel Swan, Kiko Pellicano, Marcelo Ferreira, Marcos Soares, Nelson Falcão and Ronaldo Senfft. The country also has olympic medalists from São Paulo Robert Scheidt, Torben Grael, Kahena Kunze, Reinaldo Conrad, Alexandre Welter, Bruno Prada and Peter Ficker. In equestrianism, the Gávea Hippodrome trained athletes such as Rodrigo Pessoa and his father Nelson Pessoa, as well as Luiz Felipe de Azevedo; the country also has olympic medalists from São Paulo Álvaro de Miranda Neto and from Rio Grande do Sul André Johannpeter. Argentina also trains high-level athletes in yachting, with some Olympic medals. Santiago Lange and Cecilia Carranza were Olympic champions in 2016, and the country still had 4 silvers and 5 bronzes in yachting by the 2020 games. The country has already won an Olympic silver in equestrian with Carlos Moratorio. Chile won 2 Olympic silvers in 1952 in equestrianism, mainly with the help of Óscar Cristi.

Chess

Chess is a sport with many fans in South America. The continent has produced some great players such as Argentine Miguel Najdorf (known for the Najdorf Variation), and Brazilians Henrique Mecking (3rd best in the world in 1977) and Luis Paulo Supi (who defeated world champion Magnus Carlsen).

Table tennis 
Table tennis is very popular and widely played in Brazil, and the country has a considerable tradition in this sport. The greatest player in the history of the country is Hugo Calderano, who reached number 3 in the world in 2022 (becoming the greatest Americas player of all time), and was the first South American to reach the quarterfinals of this sport at the Olympic Games. Other historically important players in the country are Gustavo Tsuboi, Cláudio Kano, Hugo Hoyama and Bruna Takahashi. The best players from Argentina so far have been Liu Song, Gastón Alto and Horacio Cifuentes. For Chile, the player Berta Rodríguez stood out.

Baseball
Baseball is the most popular sport in Venezuela. In Colombia, Baseball is very popular in their north region, and has been gaining popularity recently in the other regions of Colombia. A wide list of players from Venezuela and Colombia are in the major leagues in the United States. Both countries are the only ones in this region to participate in the World Baseball Classic (plus Brazil) and the Caribbean Series.

Field Hockey

Very popular in Argentina (2 times World Champion). The women's national team Las Leonas is one of the world's most successful, with five Olympic medals, two World Cups, a World League and seven Champions Trophy. The national team won the World Cup in 2002 and 2010. At the Olympic Games, it won the silver medal in 2000, 2012 and 2020, as well as bronze in 2004 and 2008. Las Leonas also won the annual Champions Trophy on seven occasions, in 2001, 2008, 2009, 2010, 2012, 2014 and 2016 and the World League 2014-2015. Luciana Aymar is recognized as the best female player in the history of the sport, being the only player to have received the FIH Player of the Year Award eight times.

The men's national team Los Leones won the gold medal at the 2016 Summer Olympics and the bronze medal at the 2014 World Cup and 2008 Champions Trophy. The national squad also won Pan American Games on ten occasions and the 2005, 2007 and 2012 Champions Challenges.

Rink Hockey

Argentina has won the world cup in 5 times.

Rugby union

Rugby union is becoming popular in South America, following the recent successes of Argentina in recent Rugby World Cup competitions (3rd place in 2007 and 4th place in 2015). The popularity of the game has spread across the continent.
Uruguay, Paraguay, Colombia, Brazil, Chile, Venezuela,  Guyana, Peru and Bolivia all have Rugby Federations.

Weightlifting
Weightlifting is popular in Colombia and has been evolving in Brazil. Some of the top Colombian weightlifters are: María Isabel Urrutia, Óscar Figueroa, Mabel Mosquera and Diego Fernando Salazar. The greatest exponent of this sport in Brazil was Fernando Reis.

Cycling

Cycling in Colombia became very popular with the beginning of the annual Vuelta a Colombia race in 1951, followed by the annual Clásico RCN starting in 1961. The triumphs of Martín Emilio "Cochise" Rodríguez in European cycling competitions increased the sport's popularity, which in turn helped to develop the Colombian Cycling Federation. Rodriguez was followed by professional Colombian cyclists known as the "Colombian beetles", which include up to this date Luis "Lucho" Herrera, Luis Felipe Laverde, Fabio Parra, Víctor Hugo Peña, Santiago Botero, Mauricio Soler. The "escarabajo" (beetle) nickname was coined by radio announcer José Enrique Buitrago, while watching Ramón Hoyos climb a hill ahead of French professional racer José Beyaert during the 1955 Vuelta a Colombia.

Colombian cycling has enjoyed a renaissance in the early 2010s, with Colombian riders enjoying international success. One of the factors cited for this success has been the establishment of the 4-72 Colombia cycling team (formerly known as Colombia es Pasión-Café de Colombia), which has developed several cyclists who have gone on to compete for UCI Worldteams. The government-backed Colombia-Coldeportes cycling team competed at the 2013 Giro d'Italia, and was the first all-Colombian team to do so for 21 years. The team aimed to secure UCI ProTeam status and compete in the Tour de France, however the team announced its disbanding in October 2015 due to the withdrawal of financial support from Coldeportes, the Colombian government's sports ministry. Riders who graduated to the UCI World Tour from the team included Esteban Chaves and Darwin Atapuma. High-profile riders emerging in this period include Nairo Quintana, Rigoberto Urán, Sergio Henao, Carlos Betancur and Mariana Pajón. The two main strongholds of the sport in Colombia are the Altiplano Cundiboyacense in the centre of the country and Antioquia in the west, both being mountainous regions.

Some of the top Colombian cyclists are:

 María Luisa Calle, bronze medal winner in the 2004 Summer Olympics in Athens and World Champion.
 Fabio Parra, 3rd place in the tour de France, 1988
 Santiago Botero, Time trial world champion
 Martín Emilio "Cochise" Rodríguez, Hour world record holder and world champion in 4,000 m pursuit.
 Marlon Pérez, Youth World Champion in the points race, 1994
 Efraín Domínguez, Double world record in kilometer and 200 m pushed 1987
 Luis "Lucho" Herrera, "El jardinerito", Champion of the Dauphiné Libéré (1988, 1991) and Vuelta a España (1987), first non-European to win the Tour de France Mountains classification (1985)
 Martín Ramírez, Champion Dauphiné Libéré 1984
 Alfonso Flórez Ortiz, Champion Tour de l'Avenir 1980
 Víctor Hugo Peña, one of only three Colombian cyclists to have ever worn the yellow jersey in the Tour de France (2003).
 Rigoberto Urán, silver medal winner in the Men's Olympic Road Race, 2012 Summer Olympics, second place in the Giro d'Italia (2013, 2014), second place in the Tour de France (2017).
Mariana Pajón, gold medal winner at the 2012 Summer Olympics in the women's BMX event, gold medal winner at the 2016 Summer Olympics in the women's BMX event.
Carlos Oquendo, bronze medal winner at the 2012 Summer Olympics in the men's BMX event.
Nairo Quintana, 2nd place overall in the Tour de France, 2013, 1st place overall Tour of the Basque Country, 2013, 1st place overall Vuelta a Burgos, 2013, 1st place overall Giro d'Italia 2014, winner of Tirreno–Adriatico 2015, 1st place overall Vuelta a España 2016.
Edwin Ávila, double track cycling world champion in the points race (2011,2014).
Esteban Chaves, second place in the Giro d'Italia (2016)
Carlos Ramirez placed third at the  2016 Summer Olympics in men's BMX
Iván Sosa, 1st place overall in the 2018 Vuelta a Burgos 
Fernando Gaviria wearer of the Yellow Jersey in the 2018 Tour de France
Egan Bernal winner of the general and youth classifications in the 2019 Tour de France and 2021 Giro d'Italia

Golf
Golf is growing in popularity in both Brazil and Argentina but is not widely played elsewhere in South America. Bolivia has the highest tournament class golf course in the world.

Jai Alai
Jai alai or Basque pelota is played in many parts of South America. Although this sport is mostly played in Spain and France, there are federations of Basque ball in Argentina, Bolivia, Brazil, Chile, Ecuador, Paraguay, Peru, Uruguay, and Venezuela. Due to the origin of the game, there are many good players who are Basques, either natives or from the Basque diaspora.

Cricket

Cricket is the most popular sport in Guyana. Apart from there, is mostly played in the Southern Cone, especially in areas settled by English people. Although a number of South American nations have teams, none of them are major, except for the Guyana national cricket team, which plays in inter-regional competitions in the Caribbean. Guyana is also an independent nation represented by the West Indies cricket team, the only team in the Americas with Test status.

South American Cricket Championship is a limited overs cricket tournament played since 1995 between the national teams of the continent with North American teams also often invited to participate. It is currently played annually but until 2013 was usually played biennially.

Variants of street cricket are also played, such as bete-ombro in Brazil.

Polo
Polo is popular in some parts of Argentina, Brazil, Chile, and Uruguay.

Games
 South American Games
 South American Masters Games
 South American University Games
 South American Schools Games
 South American Transplant Games
 Bolivarian Games
 ALBA Games
 Ibero American Games
 Indigenous Peoples' Games
 South American Deaf Games
 South American Blind Games

See also 
Sport in Africa
Sport in Asia
Sport in Europe
Sport in North America
Sport in Oceania

References